The Universal Hip Hop Museum is a museum dedicated to the celebration and preservation of Hip hop music, dance, art and culture and "permanent place to celebrate the music that has made the Bronx famous around the world."  The museum will be located on Exterior Street in the The Bronx when construction is complete.

History
The museum was founded in 2015, by notable Hip Hop pioneers, including Kurtis Blow, Afrika Bambaataa and Grandmaster Melly Mel, to document, preserve, and celebrate the culture of Hip Hop.

Museum 
The 52,000-square-foot museum will be part of a South Bronx multi-use development project at 610 Exterior Street called Bronx Point. Not far from the so-called birthplace of hip hop on Sedgwick Avenue, it will include a 300-seat theatre in addition to gallery and community space. The official groundbreaking was held on May 20, 2021, and involved a number of hip hop notables including Grandmaster Flash and LL Cool J. The museum has plans for an official ground breaking ceremony at the Bronx Point site in March 2021.  The museum is scheduled to open in 2024 in connection with the genre's fiftieth anniversary.

Programming
The [R]Evolution of Hip Hop Experience opened at the Bronx Terminal Market on December 6, 2019, as the museum's first public exhibit in its temporary home until construction finishes. The 2,350 square-foot exhibit is free to the public serves as a preview to what will be on display in the permanent home of the Universal Hip Hop Museum. The exhibit features artifacts of Hip Hop culture, music, photographs kiosks with content and experiences, as well as interactive elements including a DJ stand where visitors can test out their skills. Following a closure due to the COVID-19 pandemic, the space reopened in November 2020 with an exhibit focusing on 1980s hip hop.

References

External links

Museums established in 2015
Museums in the Bronx
Proposed museums in the United States
History of hip hop
2015 establishments in New York City